Ophiopsammus is a genus of brittle stars within the family Ophiodermatidae.

Species 

 Ophiopsammus aequalis 
 Ophiopsammus anchista 
 Ophiopsammus angusta 
 Ophiopsammus assimilis 
 Ophiopsammus maculata 
 Ophiopsammus yoldii

References 

Ophiuroidea genera
Ophiurida